To be distinguished from Chazeau, Loire a commune in France merged with Firminy in 1959.
Chazeau is a settlement in Guadeloupe, on the island of Grande-Terre.  It is located to the east of Quatre Chemins and Boisripeau.

References

Populated places in Guadeloupe